
Year 703 (DCCIII) was a common year starting on Monday (link will display the full calendar) of the Julian calendar. The denomination 703 for this year has been used since the early medieval period, when the Anno Domini calendar era became the prevalent method in Europe for naming years.

Events 
 By place 
 Byzantine Empire 
 Arab–Byzantine War: The Umayyad army under Abdallah ibn Abd al-Malik captures Mopsuestia in Cilicia from the Byzantines, and refortifies it, making it the first major Muslim stronghold in the area that will later become the Thughur.
 Musa ibn Nusayr, governor of Ifriqiya (western Libya), builds a Muslim fleet to harass the Byzantine navy and conquer the islands of Ibiza, Majorca, and Menorca (approximate date).

 Europe 
 Faroald II, duke of Spoleto, attacks the Exarchate of Ravenna in Italy, after the death of his father Thrasimund I. King Aripert II of the Lombards, desiring good relations with the Byzantine Empire and papacy, refuses to assist him.

 Britain 
 High King Loingsech mac Óengusso and his forces are routed during an invasion of Connacht (Ireland). He is killed by the men of King Cellach mac Rogallaig (approximate date).

 By topic 
 Religion 
 Wilfrid, Anglo-Saxon bishop, travels to Rome again, and is supported in his struggle to retain his see of York by the pope. On his way Wilfrid stops in Frisia (modern Netherlands), to visit Willibrord.
 Elias I becomes Catholicos of All Armenians.

Births 
 An Lushan, Chinese rebel leader (approximate date)
 Shi Siming, general of the Tang Dynasty (d. 761)

Deaths 
 January 13 – Jitō, empress of Japan (b. 645)
 March 20 – Wulfram, archbishop of Sens
 Ergica, king of the Visigoths (or 701)
 Ermenilda of Ely, Anglo-Saxon abbess (approximate date)
 Loingsech mac Óengusso, high king of Ireland
 Thrasimund I, duke (dux) of Spoleto

References